Pottu Amman is a 2000 Indian Tamil-Telugu bilingual devotional drama film. The Tamil version was handled by K. Rajarathinam and produced by Mangala Productions, while the Telugu version, Durga was directed by R. K. Selvamani and produced by Ramprasad Reddy. The film featured Venu and Roja alongside Suvaluxmi and Suresh Bala, while K. R. Vijaya plays a supporting role. The film was publicised as actress Roja's 100th film and got released during the month of December 2000.

Cast

Venu as Pratap
Roja as Durga and Pottu Amman
Suvaluxmi as Ganga
K. R. Vijaya as Navaneetham
Manivannan (Tamil) / Tanikella Bharani (Telugu)
Suresh Bala as Prathmipadhi
Raviraj
Kadavul Kannan
Thyagu
Baby Sneha
Kullamani
Bayilvan Ranganathan
Dubbing Janaki
Ramyasri
Raviraj
Mannangatti Subramaniam
 Raman Nayar
Ramya Krishnan as Amman (special appearance)

Production
The film was ghost directed by R. K. Selvamani, who opted to give his brother the directorial credits for the Tamil version, while he took credit for the Telugu version, Durga.

The film's release in Tamil was held up by financier Mukanchand Bothra, who filed a suit against Roja and her brother Kumarasamy Reddy for failing to repay a loan. Film director R. K. Selvamani intervened and agreed to settle the dues.

Soundtrack
Music by S. D. Shanthakumar.

Release
A critic noted "This film has a decent script but again modern treatment somehow doesn't work too well with superstitions. Director Rajarathnam has definitely been inspired by Hollywood's The Mummy in some parts." The Hindu gave the film a more critical review, stating that "the film shows that the director has made it with less of ideas and more of compromise". Regarding the Telugu version, a critic noted that "Actress Roja’s 100th film “DURGA” lacks the distinctive touch of ace director R.K.Selvamani but nevertheless it is bound to attract female audience since it is another devotional horror film laced with graphics".

References

2000 films
Hindu devotional films
2000s Tamil-language films
2000s Telugu-language films
Indian multilingual films